Shinin' N' Grindin' is the fourth studio album by American rapper E.S.G. from Houston, Texas. It was released on March 9, 1999 via Wreckshop Records. The album peaked at #71 on the Top R&B/Hip-Hop Albums in the US Billboard charts and has sold over 100,000 copies.

Track listing

Personnel
Cedric Dormaine Hill – main artist, vocals (tracks: 2-8, 10, 12-18)
Derrick Blaylock – vocals (tracks: 3-4)
Tyson Duplechain – vocals (tracks: 3, 18)
Sean Pymp – vocals (tracks: 3, 18)
Ronnie Spencer – vocals (tracks: 4, 7)
Wesley Eric Weston Jr. – vocals (track 2)
Derrick Dixon – vocals (track 4), executive producer
André Sargent – vocals (track 4), producer (tracks: 2-6, 15, 18)
Neitra – vocals (track 4)
Derrick Haynes – vocals (track 6), producer (tracks: 8, 14, 17), project coordinator, mixing
Christopher Juel Barriere – vocals (track 7)
John Edward Hawkins – vocals (track 13)
Stayve Jerome Thomas – vocals (track 15)
Dirty $ – vocals (track 18)
Barry Risper – producer (tracks: 10, 12-13)
Sinclair Ridley – producer (tracks: 7, 16)
Skip Holman – mixing & mastering
Sean George – engineering
Clyde Bazile, Jr. – art direction
Deron Neblett – photography

Charts

References

External links

1999 albums
E.S.G. (rapper) albums
Gangsta rap albums by American artists